The Mazda Lantis is a series of two cars sold in Europe and Japan from 1993 to 1998. In the rest of the world it was also known as 323F, Astina, Allegro Hatchback or Artis Hatchback.

The Mazda Lantis used Mazda's CB platform, which means close relations to the Eunos 500/Xedos 6 and the 1994-1997 Mazda Capella.  It was an FF layout car with either a manual or automatic transmission.

The body variant is what Mazda called a "4-door coupé", which in common terminology is a 5-door hatchback. In Europe the 5-door hatchback was designated BA, but was actually almost identical to the CB, and had little to do with other B platforms.

The 5-door was sold as the Mazda 323F in Europe, Artis in Chile and Allegro Hatchback (HB) in Colombia and a few other countries of Latin America. This model was penned by Ginger (Arnold) Ostle, who worked for Porsche before arriving at Mazda.

The Mazda 323F features power steering, electrically adjustable mirrors, central locking and power windows. Another noticeable feature are the frameless windows, similar to the Nissan Presea.

By the time the cars premiered in August 1993, Mazda's multi-brand strategy had become difficult to sustain, so both Lantis variants were released to Mazda, Efini and Eunos dealerships. Sales in Japan were lacklustre throughout the Lantis' production run, but the 323F proved to be immensely popular in Europe and some Latin America countries, where it sold in reasonable numbers right until it was discontinued. The JDM Lantis was a popular used export to New Zealand.

The rare Type-R version of the Mazda Lantis was sold in Japan only and could be obtained in Europe and other parts of the world through import. The Type-R features a 170ps 2.0L KF-ZE V6 engine, Limited-Slip Differential and appearance options like a front lip spoiler, side skirts, floating rear spoiler, coloured front indicators and other modifications.

The name Lantis is created from the Latin phrase "Latens Curtis", which roughly translates as "To secretly shorten".

Although the 323F lacks a badge indicating which engine is fitted, the V6 version is easily recognizable since it is the only 323F with 5 stud hubs.

The South African and possibly other versions of the 323F branded as the Astina do include badges on the back indicating the engine capacity. The 1.8l is displayed with a badge reading 180 for example.

References

External links

Lantis
Touring cars
Cars introduced in 1993
323F
Hatchbacks